In theology, one meaning of the term dispensation is as a distinctive arrangement or period in history that forms the framework through which God relates to mankind.

Baháʼí dispensations
In the Baháʼí Faith, a dispensation is a period of progressive revelation relating to the major religions of humanity, usually with a prophet accompanying it.
The faith's founder Bahá'u'lláh advanced the concept that dispensations tend to be millennial, mentioning in the Kitáb-i-Íqán that God will renew the "City of God" about every thousand years, and specifically mentioned that a new Manifestation of God would not appear within 1,000 years (1852–2852) of the inaugurating moment of Bahá'u'lláh's Dispensation, but that the authority of Bahá'u'lláh's message could last up to 500,000 years.

Latter Day Saint dispensations
In the Latter Day Saint movement, a dispensation is a period of time in which God gave priesthood authority to men on the Earth through prophetic callings. Between each dispensation is an apostasy where the priesthood is at least partially absent. The LDS Bible Dictionary says: 

The Church of Jesus Christ of Latter-day Saints teaches that there have been many dispensations, and use the Bible and modern revelation to identify and clarify some of them.  They also make note of dispensations occurring among the Lost Tribes of Israel as well as Book of Mormon peoples, namely the Nephites and the Jaredites.

Adamic dispensation
According to Latter-day Saint scriptures, an angel appeared to Adam and Eve soon after they were driven out of the Garden of Eden, who taught them the gospel and gave him priesthood authority, which he passed down to his children (see Moses 5:6–9, Moses 6:64–65). However, most of his children rejected their parents' teachings,  they "began from that time forth to be carnal, sensual, and devilish" (see Moses 5:12–13). The priesthood was only had amongst a small group of people.

Dispensation of Enoch
See (Moses 7:69; Doctrine and Covenants D&C 107:48, D&C 107:53.) 
According to LDS scripture, Enoch began a new era of spiritual knowledge for much of the world. However, after his followers (the people of Zion) were taken from the earth, the wicked people became very numerous.

Dispensation of Noah
See Moses 8:19–20.

Dispensation of Abraham
See D&C 84:14; Abraham 1:16,18.
LDS scripture teaches that Abraham received the priesthood from Melchizedek, who could trace  os authority back to Noah. Abraham received a sacred covenant with God, that his descendants would become a blessing to the world, and inherit a promised land to live in. His spiritual leadership was continued by Isaac, Jacob (Israel), and Joseph. LDS scripture teaches that Joseph prophesied of a notable future prophet bearing his name.

Mosaic dispensation
See D&C 84:6.
Like Muslims and other Christian groups, Latter-day Saints recognize Moses as starting a new dispensation of spiritual knowledge for the descendants of Israel. Like many Christians, they believe that the Law of Moses was a lesser law, to prepare the people for the coming of Christ. Smaller renewals of spiritual knowledge came through many of the great Old Testament prophets, such as Samuel and Elijah.

Dispensation of the meridian of time
This dispensation's authority was in Jesus Christ himself and then with the apostles after his death and resurrection. Following their death, shortly after the record of the Bible, and before the first seven Ecumenical Councils, Latter-day Saints believe that the Earth fell into the Great Apostasy, a time with no authorized priesthood and with great confusion about true doctrine.

Dispensation of the fulness of times
The dispensation of the fulness of times is the last dispensation before the Second Coming of Christ. It was begun with the restoration of the church in 1830 and continued with the restoration of all the priesthood keys of each prior dispensation. LDS scripture records John the Baptist, Moses, Elijah, Peter, James, and John giving authority to Joseph Smith, Jr. and some of his supporters. All LDS priesthood holders trace their line of authority back to these visitations, often with documentation of each successive ordination.

Protestant dispensations
The concept of a dispensation – the arrangement of divisions in biblical history – dates back to Irenaeus in the second century. Other Christian writers and leaders since then, such as Augustine of Hippo and Joachim of Fiore (1135–1202), have also offered their own dispensation arrangements of history. Many Protestant writers, including Herman Witsius, Francis Turretin, and Isaac Watts (1674–1748) also preached and taught dispensation schemes and divisions, and the Westminster Confession of Faith noted "various dispensations" in 1646.

Within dispensationalism, dispensations are a series of chronologically successive dispensations of biblical history. The number of dispensations held are typically three,  four, seven or eight. The three and four dispensation schemes are often referred to as minimalist, as they recognize the commonly held major breaks within biblical history. The seven and eight dispensation schemes are often closely associated with the announcement or inauguration of certain biblical covenants. The variance in number relates to the extent of detail being emphasized by the author or speaker. Below is a table comparing some of the various dispensational schemes:

These different dispensations are not separate ways of salvation. During each of them man is reconciled to God in only one way, (i.e. by God's grace through the work of Christ that was accomplished on the cross and vindicated in His resurrection). Before the cross, man was saved on the basis of Christ's atoning sacrifice to come, through believing the revelation thus far given. Since the cross, man has been saved by believing in the Lord Jesus Christ, in whom revelation and redemption have been consummated. On man's part, the continuing requirement is obedience to the revelation of God. This obedience is referred to as stewardship of faith.

Although the divine revelation unfolds progressively, the deposit of truth in earlier time-periods is not discarded, rather it is cumulative. Thus conscience (moral responsibility) is an abiding truth in human life (Ro. 2:15; 9:1; 2 Co. 1:12; 4:2), although it does not continue as a dispensation. Similarly, the saved of this present dispensation are "not under law" as a specific test of obedience to divine revelation (Gal. 5:18; cp. Gal 2:16; 3:11), yet the law remains an integral part of Dispensational teaching. The Law clarifies that, although Christ fulfilled the law for us, by it we have had the knowledge of sin (Rom 7:7), and it is an integral part of the Holy Scriptures, which, to the redeemed, are profitable for "training in righteousness" (2 Ti. 3:16–17; cp. Ro. 15:4). The purpose of each dispensation, then, is to place man under a specific rule of conduct, but such stewardship is not a condition of salvation. In every past dispensation unregenerate man has failed, much like he is failing in the present dispensation, and will fail in the future until Eternity arrives. Salvation has been and will continue to be available to everyone by God's grace through faith. (The New Scofield Study Bible, 1984, pg. 3–4).

See also
 Dispensationalist theology

References 

Bahá'í terminology
Christian terminology
Systematic theology
Time in religion